Andrew Neil George (born 9 October 1952) is a British diplomat. George served as the Governor and Commander-in-Chief of Anguilla from July 2006 to March 2009.

Prior to becoming governor, he had a long career serving the Foreign and Commonwealth Office including postings in Australia, Paraguay, Thailand (where he met his wife) and Indonesia, where his posting ended early after the 
2002 Bali bombings.

Personal life
He and his wife, Watanalak George who was born in Thailand.  The couple have two children: a daughter, Arada and a son, Michael.

Andrew George grew up in Scotland and has a university degree in politics and modern history.

See also
 List of current heads of government of dependencies
 Governor of Anguilla

References

1952 births
Living people
Governors of Anguilla
Diplomats from Edinburgh
British diplomats